The 1950–51 Swedish Division I season was the seventh season of the Swedish Division I. Djurgardens IF defeated AIK in the league final, 2 games to none.

Regular season

Northern Group

Southern Group

Final
Djurgårdens IF – AIK 10–2, 6–2

External links
 1950–51 season

Swedish Division I seasons
1950–51 in Swedish ice hockey leagues
Swedish